The diving competitions at the 1968 Summer Olympics in Mexico City featured four events
. It was one of three aquatic sports at the Games, along with swimming, and water polo.

The events were men's and women's versions each of: 3m springboard and 10m platform.

The diving competitions featured up to 81 athletes.

Schedule

Medalists

Medal table

The events are named according to the International Olympic Committee labelling, but they appeared on the official report as "springboard diving" and "high diving" (or "platform diving"), respectively.

Men

Women

Participating nations
Here are listed the nations that were represented in the diving events and, in brackets, the number of national competitors.

See also
 Diving at the 1967 Pan American Games

Notes

References
 
 

 
1968 Summer Olympics events
1968
1968 in water sports